Dichomeris xanthoa is a moth in the family Gelechiidae. It was described by Ronald W. Hodges in 1986. It is found in North America, where it has been recorded from Nebraska, Illinois, Indiana, North Carolina, Tennessee, Florida, Mississippi and Manitoba.

References

Moths described in 1986
xanthoa